Waldrip Ledge is a conspicuous area of relatively level exposed rock along the north margin of Britannia Range. The feature (c.6 square mi and rising to c.900 m) is located on the east side of the terminus of Ragotzkie Glacier at the juncture with Hatherton Glacier. Named by Advisory Committee on Antarctic Names (US-ACAN) after Mr. D. Waldrip of Holmes and Narver, Inc., camp manager of the United States Antarctic Research Program (USARP) Darwin Glacier Field Camp in the 1978–79 season. The camp was near this feature.

Ridges of Oates Land